Peter John Paul Nicholson (February 16, 1954 – September 20, 2011) was a Canadian ice hockey forward who played for the Washington Capitals.  He was originally selected in 1974 by the Capitals, and by the Michigan Stags of the World Hockey Association.

External links

Profile at hockeydraftcentral.com

1954 births
2011 deaths
Canadian ice hockey left wingers
Ice hockey people from Ontario
London Knights players
Michigan Stags draft picks
People from Perth County, Ontario
Washington Capitals draft picks
Washington Capitals players